Jubaea is a genus of palms with one species, Jubaea chilensis or Jubaea spectabilis, commonly known in English as the Chilean wine palm or Chile cocopalm, and palma chilena in Spanish. It is native to southwestern South America and is endemic to a small area of central Chile between 32°S and 35°S in southern Coquimbo, Valparaíso, Santiago, O'Higgins, and northern Maule regions.

It has long been assumed that the extinct palm tree of Easter Island belonged to this genus as well; however, in 2008, John Dransfield controversially placed it in its own genus, Paschalococos.

Growth

The thickest well-documented Jubaea  was on the estate of J. Harrison Wright in Riverside, California. The largest individual specimen of indoor plant in the world was the Jubaea chilensis at Kew Gardens, which was cut off by staff in 2014 because it grew to the top of its greenhouse. Of the more than 2,600 known species of palms, Jubaea chilensis is the second most massive, exceeded only by the floodplain or river bottom variety of Borassus aethiopum.

Uses
The leaves can be used to weave baskets, and it has edible seeds. The sap can be used to make palm wine and palm syrup, although unlike other palms which can be tapped, the whole tree has to be felled; this is now restricted by legal protection.

Conservation

The species is partially protected within Chile, although pressures of human population growth and expansion of grazing areas have reduced the population of the Chilean wine palm in recent centuries. The IUCN Red List considers the palm Endangered.

History
Charles Darwin examined these trees on visiting Chile in 1832 on the second voyage of HMS Beagle and noted:

It was believed to be the world's tallest indoor plant, until it had to be felled in 2013 because it had outgrown the space available and could not be moved. It has been replaced by seedlings from the original tree.

Gallery

See also

 Dasyphyllum excelsum

References

Further reading
 C. Donoso (2005) Árboles nativos de Chile. Guía de reconocimiento. Edición 4. Marisa Cuneo Ediciones, Valdivia, Chile. 136p
  Listed as Vulnerable (VU A1cd v2.3)
 Information from Encyclopedia of Chilean Flora
 C. Michael Hogan (2008) Chilean Wine Palm: Jubaea chilensis, GlobalTwitcher.com, ed. Nicklas Stromberg

External links
Jubaea chilensis species profile from Royal Botanic Gardens, Kew
Floridata: Jubaea chilensis; description and places in Europe where it has been introduced
Philip W. Rundel (2002) The Chilean Wine Palm
Palm & Cycad Society of Australia: Jubaea chilensis

Cocoseae
Monotypic Arecaceae genera
Flora of central Chile
Trees of Chile
Chilean Matorral
Trees of Mediterranean climate
Vulnerable flora of South America
Garden plants of South America
Ornamental trees
Drought-tolerant trees
Taxa named by Henri Ernest Baillon
Taxa named by Juan Ignacio Molina